Meshir 16 - Coptic Calendar - Meshir 18

The seventeenth day of the Coptic month of Meshir, the sixth month of the Coptic year. In common years, this day corresponds to February 11, of the Julian Calendar, and February 24, of the Gregorian Calendar. This day falls in the Coptic Season of Shemu, the season of the Harvest.

Commemorations

Martyrs 

 The martyrdom of Saint Mina the Monk

Other commemorations 

 The consecration of the Church of Saint Castor of Bardanaouha

References 

Days of the Coptic calendar